Pityrodia gilruthiana is a flowering plant in the mint family Lamiaceae and is endemic to Arnhem Land in the Northern Territory. It is a dark green, spreading shrub with sticky, glandular branches and leaves and fragrant, off-white, bell-like flowers with purple stripes on the end.

Description

The tube is off-white in colour with deep purple streaks on the upper lip. The lobes form two "lips" - the upper one with two lobes and the lower one longer with three lobes. The outer, top part of the tube has soft hairs but the rest is mostly glabrous apart from a dense hairy ring below the stamens. The four stamens extend slightly beyond the end of the tube, the lower pair slightly longer than the other one.

Taxonomy and naming
Pityrodia gilruthiana was first formally described in 1979 by Ahmad Abid Munir from a specimen collected near the Mount Gilruth in the Northern Territory. The description was published in Journal of the Adelaide Botanic Gardens.

Distribution
This pityrodia occurs in Arnhem Land near Mount Gilruth in the Kakadu National Park including the Arnhem Plateau and Pine Creek biogeographic regions.

Conservation
Pityrodia gilruthiana is classified as "least concern" under the Territory Parks and Wildlife Conservation Act 2000.

References

gilruthiana
Plants described in 1979
Flora of the Northern Territory